Taras Senkiv may refer to:
Taras Senkiv (bishop) (born 1960), Ukrainian Greek-Catholic hierarch, Bishop of Stryi
Taras Senkiv (luger) (born 1989), Ukrainian luger